Anolis concolor, the Isla San Andres anole, is a species of lizard in the family Dactyloidae. The species is found on San Andrés.

References

Anoles
Endemic fauna of San Andrés
Reptiles described in 1862
Taxa named by Edward Drinker Cope